Endoclita metallica is a species of moth of the family Hepialidae. It is found in India.

References

External links
Hepialidae genera

Moths described in 1941
Hepialidae